Herpetosiphon is a genus of bacteria in the family Herpetosiphonaceae.

Phylogeny

References

Phototrophic bacteria
Bacteria genera
Chloroflexota